Claudia Elena Schiess Fretz (born 26 November 1989) is an Ecuadorian beauty queen crowned Miss Ecuador 2011 and represented her country in the Miss Universe pageant that same year. 
On October 22, 2011, she won Miss American Continent 2011; becoming the first Ecuadorian to achieve this title.

Biography 
The daughter of a German father and a Swiss mother, Schiess graduated with a BSBA from Universidad Del Pacifico - Ecuador. She speaks fluent Spanish, English, French and German.

She is also a professional make-up artist, social media personality and motivational speaker. She likes dance, theater and music. She also studies modern dance in Galápagos.

Career

Miss Supranational 2010 
Before her participation in Miss Ecuador 2011, Claudia was summoned by the organization of her country to represent Ecuador in Miss Supranational, held on August 28, 2010, in Plock, Poland.

Miss Ecuador 2011 
Schiess competed representing the Galápagos Province, as one of the 19 candidates in the Miss Ecuador 2011 pageant, transmitted live on March 17, 2011, in Santo Domingo de los Tsáchilas;  where she obtained recognition for "Best Figure", "Best Countenance" and "Best Hair" becoming the title holder, and earning the right to represent Ecuador in Miss Universe 2011.

Miss Universe 2011 
Represented her country in Miss Universe 2011 held in Credit Card Hall in São Paulo, Brazil, on September 12, 2011.

Miss American Continent 2011 
Representing Ecuador once again in the Miss American Continent pageant in spanish Miss Continente Americano (currently called Miss United Continents) in the same year, held in the Palacio de Cristal  in Guayaquil, Ecuador on October 22, 2011,  becoming the first Ecuadorian to become winner and title holder.

Television 
Her first steps in television were in the Ecuadorian television channel Gama TV. In 2014 she incorporated to Ecuador TV, where she was a presenter for two years in the morning show Café TV, which aired in July 2016 and was a presenter for BBC specials.

In Santa Cruz, where her parents live she has launched Cucuve Suites hotel, which functions in a property that belonged to her grandparents from Switzerland when they visited the archipelago.

She currently hosts a local radio program "Entre santos y pecadores", on Radio Forever (92.5 FM).

References 

Miss Continente Americano
Miss Ecuador
Miss Universe 2011 contestants
1989 births
Living people
Ecuadorian people of German descent
Ecuadorian people of Swiss descent
Ecuadorian beauty pageant winners
People from Galápagos Province